Mitogen-activated protein kinase kinase kinase 3 is an enzyme that in humans is encoded by the MAP3K3 gene, which is located on the long arm of chromosome 17 (17q23.3).

Function 

This gene product is a 626-amino acid polypeptide that is 96.5% identical to mouse MEKK3. Its catalytic domain is closely related to those of several other kinases, including mouse MEKK2, tobacco NPK, and yeast STE11. Northern blot analysis revealed a 4.6-kb transcript that appears to be ubiquitously expressed.

MAP3Ks are involved in regulating cell fate in response to external stimuli. MAP3K3 directly regulates the stress-activated protein kinase (SAPK) and extracellular signal-regulated protein kinase (ERK) pathways by activating SEK and MEK1/2 respectively. In cotransfection assays, it enhanced transcription from a nuclear factor kappa-B (NF-κB)-dependent reporter gene, consistent with a role in the SAPK pathway. Alternatively spliced transcript variants encoding distinct isoforms have been observed. MEKK3 regulates the p38, JNK and ERK1/2 pathways.

Interactions 

MAP3K3 has been shown to interact with [SQSTM1/p62],:

 BRCA1, AKT.
 GAB1, 
 MAP2K5,  and
 YWHAE.

MAP3K3 in cancer

Two SNPs in the MAP3K3 gene were found as candidates for association with colon and rectal cancers.

MEKK3 is highly expressed in 4 ovarian cancer cell lines (OVCA429, Hey, DOV13, and SKOv3). This expression level is significantly higher in those cancer cells when compared to normal cells. MEKK3 expression levels are comparable to IKK kinase activities, which also relate to activation of NFκB. High expression of MEKK3 in most of these ovarian cancer cells supposedly activate IKK kinase activity, which lead to increased levels of active NFκB. Also, MEKK3 interacts with AKT to activate NFκB. Genes related to cell survival and anti-apoptosis have increased expression in most cancer cells with high levels of MEKK3. This is probably due to constitutive activation of NFκB, which will regulate those genes. In this sense, knockdown of MEKK3 caused ovarian cancer cells to be more sensitive to drugs.

MEKK3 also interacts with BRCA1. Knocking down BRCA1 resulted in inhibited MEKK3 kinase activity. The drug paclitaxel induces MEKK3 activity and it requires functional BRCA1 to do it. It was observed that in a breast cancer cell line BRCA1-deficient (HCC1937), paclitaxel was unable to activate MEKK3. Paclitaxel may be inducing stress-response through the MEKK3/JNK/p38/MAPK pathway, but not in mutated BRCA1 cells.

References

Further reading 

 
 
 
 
 
 
 
 
 
 
 
 
 
 
 
 
 
 
 

EC 2.7.11